Eremosis is a genus of flowering plants in the daisy family.

 Species
 Eremosis heydeana (J.M.Coult.) Gleason - Oaxaca, Chiapas, Guatemala
 Eremosis leiocarpa (DC.) Gleason - Chiapas, Guatemala, Belize, Honduras, El Salvador, Nicaragua
 Eremosis littoralis Gleason - Colima
 Eremosis oolepis (S.F.Blake) Gleason - Yucatán, 	Quintana Roo
 Eremosis pallens (Sch.Bip.) Gleason - Chiapas, México State, Morelos, Guerrero, Nayarit
 Eremosis shannonii Gleason - Chiapas, Guatemala
 Eremosis tarchonanthifolia (DC.) Gleason - Oaxaca
 Eremosis tomentosa (La Llave & Lex.) Gleason - Michoacán, Morelos, Mexico State
 Eremosis triflosculosa (Kunth) Gleason - Chiapas, El Salvador

References

Vernonieae
Asteraceae genera
Taxa named by Augustin Pyramus de Candolle